"Leave My Kitten Alone" is a 1959 R&B hit, written by Little Willie John, Titus Turner and James McDougal, first recorded by Little Willie John. The song follows a 24-bar blues format.

Little Willie John
The original version of the song, by Little Willie John, on King Records, reached No. 13 on the Billboard R&B chart and No. 60 on the pop chart on its first release in 1959. A second release again reached No. 60, after cover version by Johnny Preston reached No. 73 on the singles chart in early 1961. Over the intervening decades, numerous covers have been recorded, in different musical genres, sometimes with altered lyrics.

The Beatles
An early version by the Beatles was released in 1994 on Anthology 1.  On August 14, 1964, during the recording sessions for Beatles for Sale, the Beatles recorded five takes of "Leave My Kitten Alone", adding overdubs to the last take. The song was never mixed and was not included on Beatles for Sale. Take 5 was marked as the best take (only takes 4 and 5 exist, 4 being a false start).

The song was remixed in 1982 by John Barrett in preparation for The Beatles at Abbey Road, a video presentation shown as part of a public tour of the Abbey Road Studios the following year.  It was again remixed in 1984 by Geoff Emerick in preparation for inclusion on the unreleased Sessions project. In 1994, Geoff Emerick remixed the song yet again, this time for the Anthology project; it finally saw official release on the project's first volume the following year.

Notes

1959 songs
1959 singles
1961 singles
Songs written by Titus Turner
The Beatles songs
Johnny Preston songs
King Records (United States) singles
Mercury Records singles